Rhinella, commonly known as South American toads, beaked toads or Rio Viejo toads, is a genus of true toads native to Neotropical parts of Mexico, Central and South America. Additionally, the cane toad has been introduced to Australia, the Caribbean, the Philippines and elsewhere.

Originally, all species of the genus Rhinella were included in the genus Bufo, then they were split into the genera Chaunus and Rhamphophryne. However, Chaunus and Rhamphophryne are now considered synonyms of Rhinella.

Etymology
 Rhinella means ‘little nose’, from rhino-, the combining form of the Ancient Greek  (‘nose’)  and the Latin diminutive suffix -ella.
 Chaunus is the Latinised form of the Ancient Greek  (‘porous, spongy’).

Species
The following species are recognised in the genus Rhinella:

Notes

References
  (2006). "The Amphibian Tree of Life". Bulletin of the American Museum of Natural History 297: 1–371.

External links
 

 
Amphibian genera
Amphibians of Central America
Amphibians of South America
Taxa named by Leopold Fitzinger